Vahap Şanal (born 26 May 1998) is a Turkish chess grandmaster and two-time Turkish Chess Champion.

Chess career
In 2006, Şanal became the youngest player on the Turkish national team at the age of eight and defeated world champion Magnus Carlsen in an online blitz game in 2019.

Şanal won the 4th World Schools Chess Championships, U11 section in 2008, scoring 8.5/9, and becoming a Candidate master in the process. In 2012, he won the European School Championship Open 15, scoring 8.5/9, and also became a FIDE Master that year.

He won the Turkish Chess Championship in 2019 and 2020.

He qualified to play in the Chess World Cup 2021 and Chess World Cup 2023. Şanal took part in the 23rd European Chess Championship and won the individual bronze medal for his board.

In 2022, Şanal played first board at Turkish Chess Super League. He scored 9/12 winning the first board prize with performance of 2796.

References

External links
Vahap Şanal
Vahap Şanal at chessgames.com

Living people
1998 births
Turkish chess players
Chess grandmasters